Da Ding or Tai Ding was the eldest son of King Tang but sources are conflicted as to whether he actually succeeded his father as a Shang dynasty King of China or not.

Records 
In the Records of the Grand Historian he was said by Sima Qian to have died at an early age without succeeding his father King Tang. He was given the posthumous name Tai Ding and the throne passed to his younger brother Wai Bing and later to his own son Tai Jia.

Inscriptions on oracle bones unearthed at Yinxu record that he was the second Shang king, given the posthumous name Da Ding, and succeeded by his sons Da Jia (Tai Jia) and Bu Bing (Wai Bing).

Notes

Shang dynasty kings